Hope Island State Park - Skagit is a  Washington marine state park located on Hope Island at the northern end of Skagit Bay in Skagit County. The island has primitive campsites, beaches and forest with occasional meadows and rock outcroppings, and a trail across the island. Five mooring buoys are found on the island's northern flank. Herons nest on the southwestern end of the island. Significant cliffs surround most of the island, making getting inland a challenge.

References

External links
Hope Island State Park - Skagit Washington State Parks and Recreation Commission

State parks of Washington (state)
Parks in Skagit County, Washington